Hootie & the Blowfish is the fourth studio album by American rock band Hootie & the Blowfish, released on March 4, 2003. It is their last album under Atlantic Records and their first album to not have a single to reach the top charts. The lead singles were "Innocence" and "Space", and the album itself reached no. 46 in the U.S.

Track listing
"Deeper Side" – 3:38
"Little Brother" – 3:09
"Innocence" – 3:24
"Space" – 2:15
"I'll Come Runnin'" – 3:48
"Tears Fall Down" – 3:05
"The Rain Song" – 3:52
"Show Me Your Heart" – 4:03
"When She's Gone" – 4:06
"Little Darlin'" – 3:18
"Woody" – 3:15
"Go and Tell Him (Soup Song)", includes the hidden track: "It's Alright" – 9:41

Charts

References

2003 albums
Albums produced by Don Was
Atlantic Records albums
Hootie & the Blowfish albums